Friedrich Wilhelm Brandes (29 June 1877 – 5 October 1959) was a German-born Swedish rowing coxswain who competed in the 1912 Summer Olympics.

He coxed the Swedish boat Göteborgs that was eliminated in the quarter finals of the men's coxed fours, inriggers tournament.

References

1877 births
1959 deaths
Swedish male rowers
Coxswains (rowing)
Olympic rowers of Sweden
Rowers at the 1912 Summer Olympics
German emigrants to Sweden